Yes You Can is the third studio album by British singer-songwriter Steve Harley. It was released by CTE in Europe in 1992 and by Food For Thought Records in the UK in 1993.

Yes You Can was Harley's first studio album since 1979's The Candidate. It contains songs he wrote and originally recorded in the 1980s alongside newer material. The album was produced by Harley and Matt Butler, except "Rain in Venice" which was produced Mickie Most, Harley and Butler, and "Irresistible" which was produced by Most and Harley.

Background
After his success with Cockney Rebel in the 1970s, Harley was less active in the music industry during the 1980s. He released the occasional single, some of which became minor hits, and only performed live on a limited basis. In 1985, he signed a new contract with Mickie Most's Rak Records and began recording material for a new solo album, El Gran Senor, at RAK Studios in London. Some of the tracks recorded for the project included "Irresistible", "Rain in Venice", "New-Fashioned Way", "The Lighthouse", "Star for a Week", "Promises Promises", "Sophistication" and the 1970 Edwin Starr song "Oh How Happy". "Irresistible" was released as a single in 1985 and a remixed version was also issued as a single in the following year. The 1986 single announced the upcoming album El Gran Senor, but before it was released, RAK folded and was sold to EMI, and the album was shelved.

Harley returned to touring with a new line-up of Steve Harley & Cockney Rebel in 1989. Before the tour, Harley and ex-Cockney Rebel members Duncan Mackay and Jim Cregan entered Point Studios in London to write and record four new songs, "Dancing on the Telephone", "When I'm with You", "The Alibi" and "Limbs of Man". In early 1989, Harley announced that an album of new material would be recorded in the summer and released in the autumn. Although no album materialised, Harley revealed in 1990 that work on the album was almost completed, but he was unsure when it would be released as he had no record deal. He listed the likely inclusions of the album as being "The Lighthouse", "Star for a Week", "Promises", "Victim of Love", "Dancing on the Telephone" and "Not Alone Anymore" - the latter being a cover of the 1988 song by the supergroup Traveling Wilburys.

In 1992, Harley revealed to Record Collector, "I'm very proud of it. It sounds like a hundred and fifty grand album, and I've spent about a quarter of that on it. Because we were so well rehearsed we went in and played. I do use state of the art equipment. I've been 19 years in the business, as a professional, so I know a few tricks."

Recording
All tracks were recorded at the White House Studios in Bures, Suffolk, except "Irresistible", which was recorded at RAK Studios, and "Rain in Venice", recorded at RAK Studios and Metropolis Studios. "Rain in Venice", "New-Fashioned Way", "The Lighthouse", "The Alibi" and "Promises" were remixed at Metropolis Studios, and "Victim of Love", "Star for a Week (Dino)", "Fire in the Night" and "Dancing on the Telephone" were remixed at White House Studios. "Irresistible" was remixed at Air Studios. The album was mastered by Steve Rooke and Ian Jones at Abbey Road Studios in London. Rod Stewart provided some backing vocals during recording sessions for Yes You Can, but his contributions were not used.

Song information
Yes You Can features a mixture of older songs dating from the El Gran Senor period as well as some newer tracks. Of the album's ten tracks, the 1986 extended remix of "Irresistible" and "Rain in Venice" were lifted from El Gran Senor. "New-Fashioned Way" was originally recorded for El Gran Senor as an up-tempo track and "The Lighthouse" used different instrumentation including a saxophone solo (as opposed to the violin solo on Yes You Can). Harley decided to re-record "New-Fashioned Way" for Yes You Can after he began performing the song live in 1991. "Star for a Week", one of the oldest songs, was first performed live in 1979, while two of the newer songs, "Victim of Love" and "Fire in the Night", were written while on tour.

Release
Yes You Can was released on CD and cassette by CTE in Europe in 1992. It was marketed and distributed by Cte GmbH and manufactured in Switzerland. At the same time, "Irresistible" was released for the third and final time as a single, but also in Europe only and not the UK.

Speaking to Record Collector in 1992, Harley was asked about the possibility of EMI releasing the album in the UK. Harley said, 

Yes You Can was given a UK CD and cassette release in 1993 by Food for Thought Records. The release had a re-arranged track listing a different sleeve design from the European release. A promotional single, "Star for a Week (Dino)", was released to generate radio play. Harley had expressed wishes for the label to release "Victim of Love" as a single. Harley also previously made plans to release the song as a single in the summer of 1990.

On 22 April 2002, the album was re-issued in the UK by Harley's own label Comeuppance. It uses the 1992 CTE release's artwork and track order. On 6 October 2003, Voiceprint Records released the album on CD together with Harley's album The Candidate as part of the label's "2 for One Series".

Tour
To promote the European release of the album in 1992, Harley embarked on the Yes You Can tour. In March, he played various dates across Europe which was followed by a set of UK dates in May. To promote the album's 1993 UK release, a UK tour commenced on 7 May.

Critical reception

On its release, Peter Kinghorn of Newcastle Evening Chronicle commented, "Although there's nothing with the impact of Cockney Rebel days, Harley can still put over a lyric and the compositions bear the hallmark of quality." Daily Mirror picked Yes You Can as their "album of the week" and noted that "Harley's talent shines on stunning tracks" like "Star for a Week (Dino)" and "Irresistible". Steve Jackson of the Grimsby Evening Telegraph described it as "10 tracks of commercial Harley rock" with his "familiar vocal style and phrasing". Jackson added, "I'd like to see Yes You Can zoom up the charts and return one of the lost figures of the seventies back onto our TV screens and on the radio."

Neil McKay of Sunday Life wrote, "Harley's first album for more than a decade is solid rather than spectacular. Everything is just where it should be, in a modern AOR-ish sort of way, and it cries out for the inspired weirdness that made some of his Cockney Rebel material so good." Andrew Boyd of the Reading Evening Post felt Yes You Can was a "damp squib of an album" and a "dreary, clichéd collection, unlikely to push Harley far into the charts".

Dave Thompson of AllMusic retrospectively reviewed the album, writing, "It's a sad state of affairs, but the best of Yes You Can was never going to make it onto a studio recording. Rather, it resides in the live environment where the songs almost unanimously came to life. In the studio, the emotion pales, and Harley's energies flag accordingly. Yes You Can is not the revival for which fans had been hoping for. But excuse the inadequacies and overlook the lifelessness, and the core of the songs remains sound and proud."

Track listing

Personnel

 Steve Harley – vocals (all tracks), 12-string acoustic guitar (track 9), harmonica (tracks 2, 9)
 Harvey Hinsley – guitar (track 1)
 Jim Cregan – acoustic guitar (track 3)
 Robin Le Mesurier – electric guitar (track 3)
 Alan Darby – guitar (tracks 4–5, 7, 10)
 Rick Driscoll – rhythm guitar (track 5), guitar (track 9)
 Robbie Gladwell – guitar (tracks 6, 8)
 Nick Pynn – violin (tracks 4, 7), rhythm guitar (track 8), acoustic guitar (track 10)
 Barry Wickens – acoustic guitar (track 2), violin (tracks 2, 5, 9)
 Adrian Lee – keyboards (track 1)
 Duncan Mackay – keyboards (track 3)
 Ian Nice – keyboards (tracks 2, 4-10)
 Kevin Powell – bass (tracks 2, 5, 9)
 Billy Dyer – bass (tracks 4, 7–8, 10)
 Mark Brzezicki – drums (track 1)
 Stuart Elliott – drums (tracks 2, 5, 9)
 Dave Mattacks – drums (track 3)
 Paul Francis – drums (tracks 4, 6–7, 10),  hand-snare (track 8)

Production
 Steve Harley – producer (all tracks)
 Mickie Most – producer (tracks 1, 3)
 Matt Butler – producer (tracks 2-10), engineer (tracks 2-10)
 Mike Nocito – engineer (tracks 1, 3)
 Simon Smart – engineer (tracks 2, 5, 9)
 Stuart Breed – remixing (track 1)
 Steve Rooke, Ian Jones – mastering

Other
 Mike Simister, Kevin Williamson – illustrations
 Steve D. Schwachter – art layout, design

References

Steve Harley albums
1992 albums
Albums produced by Mickie Most